Klaus Dieter Breitschwert (born 21 April 1943) is a German politician, representative of the Christian Social Union of Bavaria.

He represents Ansbach in the Landtag of Bavaria.

See also
List of Bavarian Christian Social Union politicians

References

Christian Social Union in Bavaria politicians
1943 births
Living people
Recipients of the Cross of the Order of Merit of the Federal Republic of Germany